Francis X. Shaw (September 15, 1895 – June 12, 1962) was an American assistant director. He was nominated for an Academy Award in the category Best Assistant Director.

Selected filmography 
 Slightly Used (1927)
 Sailor Izzy Murphy (1927)
 The Girl from Chicago (1927)
 Pay as You Enter (1928)
 The Lion and the Mouse (1928)
 State Street Sadie (1928) - (uncredited)
 The Singing Fool (1928)
 Stark Mad (1929)
 Honky Tonk (1929) - (uncredited)
 Night Nurse (1931) - (uncredited)
 The Star Witness (1931) - (uncredited)
 Carnival Boat (1932) - (uncredited)
 State's Attorney (1932) - (uncredited)
 White Eagle (1932) - (uncredited)
 20,000 Years in Sing Sing (1932) - (uncredited)
 Mystery of the Wax Museum (1933) - (uncredited)
 The Keyhole (1933) - (uncredited)
 The Mayor of Hell (1933) - (uncredited)
 Captured! (1933) - (uncredited)
 I Loved a Woman (1933) - (uncredited)
 Ever in My Heart (1933) - (uncredited)
 Convention City (1933)
 Mandalay (1934) - (uncredited)
 Gambling Lady (1934) - (uncredited)
 A Lost Lady (1934) - (uncredited)
 The Petrified Forest (1936) - (uncredited)
 The Story of Louis Pasteur (1936) - (uncredited)
 I Married a Doctor (1936) - (uncredited)
 The White Angel (1936) - (uncredited)
 The Captain's Kid (1936) - (uncredited)
 Three Smart Girls (1936)
 Girl Overboard (1937)
 The Great O'Malley (1937) - (uncredited)
 Wings over Honolulu (1937)
 One Hundred Men and a Girl (1937)
 Mad About Music (1938)
 The Rage of Paris (1938)
 Youth Takes a Fling (1938)
 Exposed (1938)
 Newsboys' Home (1938) - (uncredited)
 Three Smart Girls Grow Up (1938)
 The Forgotten Woman (1939) - (uncredited)
 First Love (1939)
 It's a Date (1940)
 Spring Parade (1940)
 Temptation (1946)
 The Egg and I (1947)
 Something in the Wind (1947)
 A Double Life (1947)
 All My Sons (1948)
 The Saxon Charm (1948)
 Family Honeymoon (1949)
 The Lady Gambles (1949)
 Sword in the Desert (1949) - (uncredited)
 Woman in Hiding (1950)
 One Way Street (1950) - (uncredited)
 Spy Hunt (1950)
 Mystery Submarine (1950)
 Harvey (1950) - (uncredited)
 Up Front (1951) - (uncredited)
 The Golden Horde (1951) - (uncredited)
 The Raging Tide (1951) - (uncredited)
 Flame of Araby (1951) - (uncredited)
 Meet Danny Wilson (1952)
 The World in His Arms (1952) - (uncredited)
 Sally and Saint Anne (1952)
 Because of You (1952)
 Girls in the Night (1953)
 Desert Legion (1953)
 War Arrow (1953)
 Border River (1954)
 Saskatchewan (1954)
 Playgirl (1954)
 Tanganyika (1954)
 Bengal Brigade (1954)
 Destry (1954)
 Man Without a Star (1955)
 Ain't Misbehavin' (1955)
 Lady Godiva of Coventry (1955)
 Tarantula! (1955)
 The Spoilers (1955)
 The Square Jungle (1955)
 Never Say Goodbye (1956)
 Star in the Dust (1956) - (uncredited)
 The Toy Tiger (1956)
 Congo Crossing (1956)
 I've Lived Before (1956)
 Everything But the Truth (1956)
 Kelly and Me (1956)
 Man Afraid (1957)
 My Man Godfrey (1957)
 Joe Dakota (1957)
 This Happy Feeling (1958)
 Once Upon a Horse... (1958)
 Kathy O' (1958)
 The Perfect Furlough (1958)
 Imitation of Life (1959)
 The Wild and the Innocent (1959)
 Operation Petticoat (1959)

References

External links 

1895 births
1962 deaths
People from New York (state)
Film directors from New York (state)
Assistant directors
Unit production managers